Archibald T. Higgins (c. 1894 – October 3, 1945) was a justice of the Louisiana Supreme Court from September 19, 1934, to October 3, 1945.

Higgins received his law degree at Tulane University Law School in 1916, an entered private practice the same year, serving as city attorney of Gretna, Louisiana from 1916 to 1918. He served two terms in the Louisiana House of Representatives, from 1920 to 1924, and after then serving for several years as an assistant district attorney, was appointed as an appellate court judge in 1929. In 1934, Higgins was elected to a seat on the state supreme court vacated by Justice John St. Paul, but prior to the end of the previous term, Justice Winston Overton died, and Higgins was instead appointed to succeed Overton.

References

Justices of the Louisiana Supreme Court
1890s births
1945 deaths
Tulane University Law School alumni
Members of the Louisiana House of Representatives
20th-century American politicians
20th-century American judges